Robbie McEwen  (born 24 June 1972) is an Australian former professional road cyclist. McEwen is a three-time winner of the Tour de France points classification and, at the peak of his career, was considered the world's fastest sprinter.

A former Australian BMX champion, McEwen switched to road cycling in 1990 at 18 years of age. He raced as a professional from 1996 until 2012.

McEwen retired from the World Tour after riding the 2012 Tour of California and is now a cycling broadcast commentator on the Tour Down Under and the Tour de France.

Career

McEwen was born in Brisbane. After four years of moving through the regional, state and national levels of cycling, he started at the Australian Institute of Sport in Canberra under road cycling coach Heiko Salzwedel. The first signs of his sprinting prowess on the international stage were at the Peace Race, winning three stages for the Australian national team.

McEwen competed in the road race at the 1996 Atlanta Olympic Games (23rd) and the 2000 Sydney Olympic Games (19th). He was also included on the Australian team for the 1994 UCI Road Cycling World Championship in Italy, and the 2002 UCI Road Cycling World Championship in Belgium, where he won a silver medal. McEwen was again selected for Australia at the 2004 Athens Olympic Games (11th) as part of the road race team.

McEwen was named 2002 Australian Cyclist of the Year, 2002 Male Road Cyclist of the Year and 1999 Male Road Cyclist of the Year. After spending 16 seasons racing for foreign teams (Dutch: Rabobank & Farm Frites; Belgian: Lotto; Russian: Katusha; USA: RadioShack), McEwen signed for the new Australian  team in September 2011 after it gained a ProTeam licence for the 2012 season.

Tour de France
McEwen participated in the Tour de France on 12 occasions: 1997 (117th), 1998 (89th), 1999, 2000, 2002, 2003, 2004, 2005, 2006, 2007, 2008 and 2010. Over the years, he has won 12 stages. In 1999, McEwen won the final stage sprint in Paris on the Champs-Élysées. In 2002, McEwen won stage 3 (Metz–Reims) and stage 20 (Melun–Paris). In 2004, McEwen won stages 3 and 9. In 2005, McEwen won stage 5 to Montargis, stage 7 to Karlsruhe in Germany, and stage 13 to Montpellier. In 2006, McEwen won stages 2, 4 and 6 to Esch-sur-Alzette, St Quentin and Vitré respectively.

He started the 2007 Tour with a victorious sprint on stage 1 to Canterbury. He injured his knee and wrist but with the help of his team he clawed his way back to the bunch to win the sprint by over a bike length. The injuries he sustained from this crash did not prevent him from continuing but eventually he was forced out of the race when the Tour entered the Mountains, his knee injury became worse and he failed to finish stage eight within the time limit.

In 2002, McEwen became the first Australian to win the Tour de France points classification. By 2006, McEwen had won the Tour de France green points jersey three times in this race – in 2002, 2004 and, again, in 2006 – defeating rivals such as fellow Australians Baden Cooke and Stuart O'Grady, and international competitors like Erik Zabel of Germany, Tom Boonen of Belgium and Thor Hushovd of Norway.

McEwen's first win in the 2002 Tour de France saw him win the green jersey from German legend Erik Zabel, with O’Grady third and Cooke fourth. In 2004, McEwen won the points classification for a second time, defeating Hushovd and Erik Zabel. McEwen had fractured two transverse process (vertebrae) in a mass pile up on stage 6 and continued the race in extreme pain, making his stage 9 win in Guéret all the more remarkable.

McEwen won his third and final Points classification in the 2006 Tour de France, this time with Zabel second and Hushovd third.

In 2012, he announced that the Tour of California would be the last professional race of his career. He struggled to reach the finishing line of the mountain stages in the gruppetto. He humorously said after his arrival on the final stage in Los Angeles: "This was a good race to pick as my last because I suffered so much this week I won't miss it." He was awarded the "Most Courageous Rider" jersey at the end of the race to commemorate his last day of professional cycling. After retiring from racing, McEwen remained with Orica–GreenEDGE as a technical adviser and sprint coach.

Commentating

In 2017, 2018, 2019 and 2020, Robbie McEwen commentated on the Tour de France's world feed in English, alongside fellow Australian Matthew Keenan.

In 2021 he featured on SBS Australia's coverage of a number of cycling races, but his contract was not renewed for 2022.

He commentated on the Santos Festival of Cycling for the 7 Network Australia, and joined GCN (Global Cycling Network) in March 2022. 

Anna Meares, Phil Liggett, and Robbie McEwen co-hosted the Seven Network broadcast of the 2023 Santos Men’s Tour Down Under used by  Peacock in the US.

Sprinting style
McEwen was known as a particularly cunning and tactical sprinter. Where many teams would use 'Lead-Out Trains' to secure a stage win for their selected sprinter, McEwen achieved many of his victories either with one lead-out man, or often none at all, by aggressively and intelligently positioning himself within the peloton in the final kilometres.

Fellow Australian cyclist Stuart O'Grady considers McEwen to be "one of the fastest, most powerful accelerators the planet has ever seen".

Personal life
McEwen lives in Australia with his Belgian wife, Angélique Pattyn, his son, Ewan, and his daughters, Elena and Claudia. In 2011, McEwen published an autobiography entitled 'One Way Road'. McEwen lived for many years in the Belgian town of Everbeek and is fluent in Dutch.

McEwen has two brothers, the eldest is Ross and is getting into Triathlon, the youngest, Cam, is a Scrum Master at Telstra and a car enthusiast.

Major results

1994
 Peace Race
1st Stages 3, 6b & 9 
 1st Stage 1 Tour de l'Avenir
1995
 1st Stage 4 Regio-Tour
 1st Stage 6 Tour de l'Avenir
1996
 1st Luk-Cup Bühl
 1st Stage 4 Vuelta a Murcia
 1st Stage 2 Rheinland-Pfalz Rundfahrt
 1st Stage 3b Regio-Tour
 1st Stage 4 Tour de l'Avenir
 4th Overall Herald Sun Tour
1st Stages 1b, 8b & 10b 
1997
 1st  Overall Geelong Bay Classic Series
1st Stages 1, 2 & 4
 Ronde van Nederland
1st Stages 2 & 3a
 1st Stage 2 Four Days of Dunkirk
 1st Stage 3 Tour de Luxembourg
 4th Trofeo Alcúdia
 5th GP Stad Zottegem
 10th Overall Danmark Rundt
1998
 1st Stage 1 Vuelta a Andalucía
 1st Stage 5 Geelong Bay Classic Series
 9th Overall Ronde van Nederland
1st Stages 3a & 5
1999
 1st  Overall Geelong Bay Classic Series
1st Stages 1, 4 & 5
 1st Stage 20 Tour de France
 1st Stage 2 Tour de Luxembourg
 1st Stage 1a Route du Sud
 Herald Sun Tour
1st Stages 3 & 6 
 2nd Trofeo Luis Puig
 4th Dwars door Gendringen
 9th Overall Ronde van Nederland
1st Stage 2 
2000
 1st Trofeo Alcúdia
 1st Stage 6 Tour Down Under
2001
 1st Trofeo Calvià
 Herald Sun Tour
1st Stages 3 & 4 (ITT) 
 International Uniqa Classic
1st  Points classification
1st Stages 2 & 3
 1st Stage 2 Ronde van Nederland
 1st Stage 2 Tour Méditerranéen
 8th Overall Tour de Wallonie
1st Stage 4 
 8th Nokere Koerse
2002
 1st  Road race, National Road Championships
 1st  Overall Étoile de Bessèges
1st Stage 1
 1st  Overall Circuit Franco-Belge
1st Stages 2 & 3
 1st Scheldeprijs
 1st Paris–Brussels
 1st Delta Profronde
 1st RaboRonde Heerlen
 Tour de France
1st  Points classification
1st Stages 3 & 20
 Giro d'Italia
1st Stages 4 & 10
 Paris–Nice
1st Stages 2 & 7
 Tour Down Under
1st  Points classification
1st Stages 1, 3, 4 & 6
 2nd  Road race, UCI Road World Championships
 2nd GP Rik Van Steenbergen
 3rd Tour du Haut Var
 3rd Veenendaal–Veenendaal
 4th Omloop Het Volk
2003
 1st Dwars door Vlaanderen
 Giro d'Italia
1st Stages 4 & 11
 1st Stage 2 Tour de Suisse
 1st Stage 3 Tour Down Under
 1st Stage 4 Étoile de Bessèges
 3rd Veenendaal–Veenendaal
 4th Grand Prix de Fourmies
 6th Overall Circuit Franco-Belge
1st Stage 3
 7th Delta Profronde
 Tour de France
Held  after Stages 1–5, 18 & 19 
2004
 1st Gouden Pijl
 1st Memorial Samyn-Fayt-le-Franc
 1st Profronde van Oostvoorne
 Tour de France
1st  Points classification
1st Stages 2 & 9
Held  after Stage 3
 Giro d'Italia
1st Stage 5 
Held  after Stage 5
 Tour de Suisse
1st Stages 2 & 4
 2nd Overall Tour Down Under
1st  Points classification
1st Stages 1 & 4
 2nd Overall Tour of Qatar
 2nd Scheldeprijs
 2nd Delta Profronde
 2nd Veenendaal–Veenendaal
 4th Overall Circuit de la Sarthe
1st  Points classification 
 8th Sparkassen Giro Bochum
2005
 1st  Road race, National Road Championships
 1st  Overall Bay Classic
1st Stages 1 & 4
 1st Paris–Brussels
 1st Grand Prix de Fourmies
 Tour de France
1st Stages 5, 7 & 13
 Giro d'Italia
1st Stages 2, 6 & 10
Held  after Stage 2
Held  after Stages 2–3, 6 & 10–12
 Tour Down Under
1st  Points classification 
1st Stages 1, 2 & 6
 1st Stage 4 Tour de Suisse
 1st Stage 5 Tour of Qatar
 1st Stage 4 Niedersachsen Rundfahrt
 3rd Grand Prix d'Isbergues
 4th Paris–Tours
2006
 1st  Overall Grande Prémio Internacional Costa Azul
1st  Points classification 
1st Stage 1 
 1st Paris–Brussels
 1st Down Under Classic
 Tour de France
1st  Points classification
1st Stages 2, 4 & 6
 Giro d'Italia
1st Stages 2, 4 & 6
Held  after Stages 4–12
 1st Stage 1 Tour de Romandie
 1st Stage 7 Herald Sun Tour
 2nd Overall Driedaagse van West-Vlaanderen
1st Stage 2 
 2nd Memorial Rik Van Steenbergen
 3rd Overall Tour Down Under
 4th Grand Prix de Fourmies
 5th Road race, UCI Road World Championships
2007
 1st Paris–Brussels
 Tour de France
1st Stage 1
Held  after Stage 1
 Giro d'Italia
1st Stage 2
Held  after Stages 2 & 4
 1st Stage 2 Tour de Romandie
 1st Stage 1 Tirreno–Adriatico
 1st Stage 5 Tour de Suisse
 1st Stage 5 Tour Down Under
 1st Stage 3 Jayco Bay Classic
 1st Stage 3 Eneco Tour
 2nd Scheldeprijs
 3rd Schaal Sels
 4th Milan–San Remo
 6th Gent–Wevelgem
 6th Paris–Tours
 8th Overall Circuit Franco-Belge
 9th Omloop Het Volk
2008
 1st Vattenfall Cyclassics
 1st Paris–Brussels
 Tour de Suisse
1st Stages 3 & 4
 1st Stage 2 Tour de Romandie
 3rd Scheldeprijs
 6th Paris–Tours
2009
 1st Down Under Classic
 1st Trofeo Cala Millor
 1st Stage 3 Tour de Picardie
2010
 1st Trofeo Palma de Mallorca
 1st Stage 1 Eneco Tour
 2nd Scheldeprijs
 2nd Memorial Rik Van Steenbergen
 4th Overall Tour Down Under
 6th Grand Prix de Fourmies
 7th Grote Prijs Jef Scherens
2011
 1st  Overall Tour de Wallonie-Picarde
1st Stages 1 & 4
 1st Stage 4 Tour de Wallonie
 2nd Tour de Mumbai
 4th Kampioenschap van Vlaanderen
 5th Scheldeprijs
 8th Grand Prix de Fourmies

Grand Tour general classification results timeline

Recognition
In 2015, he was an inaugural Cycling Australia Hall of Fame inductee.
In 2019, inducted into Sport Australia Hall of Fame.

References

Further reading

External links

 Australian Cycling Federation profile
 Robbie McEwen's profila at Cycling Base
 
 
 
 

1972 births
Living people
Australian Institute of Sport cyclists
Australian male cyclists
Australian Tour de France stage winners
Tour de France Champs Elysées stage winners
Olympic cyclists of Australia
Cyclists at the 1996 Summer Olympics
Cyclists at the 2000 Summer Olympics
Cyclists at the 2004 Summer Olympics
Cyclists from Brisbane
Australian Giro d'Italia stage winners
Tour de Suisse stage winners
Members of the Order of Australia
Tour de France journalists
Sport Australia Hall of Fame inductees